The White Hills are a range of hills in northern Mohave County, Arizona.  These hills lie north of the Cerbat Mountains and extend south from the Colorado River at Lake Mead between the Detrital Valley to the west and  the Gold Basin and the upper Hualapai Valley to the east. The north region of the White Hills is located in Lake Mead National Recreation Area.

The White Hills occur in a north, central, and south region. The approximate mountain range center is slightly northeast of White Hills, Arizona, the Senator Mountain, .

History
The west side of the White Hills were the site of a gold rush in 1892.  It resulted in the establishment of the boomtown of White Hills, in Arizona Territory, twenty miles east of the steamboat landing at Eldorado Canyon.

References

External links
 
 Approx. mountain range center, Senator Mountain, northeast of White Hills, AZ, at topozone.com

Lake Mead National Recreation Area
Mountain ranges of Arizona
Hills of Arizona
Mountain ranges of the Mojave Desert
Mountain ranges of Mohave County, Arizona